The 1960 NCAA University Division basketball tournament involved 25 schools playing in single-elimination play to determine the national champion of men's  NCAA Division I college basketball in the United States. It began on March 7, 1960, and ended with the championship game on March 19 in Daly City, California (immediately south of San Francisco). A total of 29 games were played, including a third-place game in each region and a national third-place game.

Ohio State, coached by Fred Taylor, won the national title with a 75–55 victory in the final game over California, coached by Pete Newell. Jerry Lucas of Ohio State was named the tournament's Most Outstanding Player.

Locations

For the first and only time, the Cow Palace was the host venue, and the city of San Francisco the host city, of the Final Four, making them the 8th and 7th respectively. San Francisco was the first host city to only host the Final Four once, something 12 of the 30 host cities have done. The tournament featured two new venues. Chicago became a host city for the third straight year, but with its fourth venue in twenty-one years, Alumni Hall on the campus of DePaul University. And the state of Utah became a host for the first time, when the George Albert Smith Fieldhouse on the campus of Brigham Young University hosted games in the West regional quarterfinals. The 1960 tournament would be the only time for Alumni Hall to host games, and the last for the Cow Palace; it would be thirty years before the tournament would return to the Bay Area, and, if the schedule holds, the city of San Francisco will host games again in 2022–at the Chase Center.

Teams

Bracket
* – Denotes overtime period

East region

Mideast region

Midwest region

West region

Final Four

National third-place game

Regional third-place games

See also
 1960 NCAA College Division basketball tournament
 1960 National Invitation Tournament
 1960 NAIA Division I men's basketball tournament

References

NCAA Division I men's basketball tournament
Ncaa
NCAA University Division basketball tournament
NCAA University Division basketball tournament
Sports in Corvallis, Oregon